New York's 58th State Senate district is one of 63 districts in the New York State Senate. It has  been represented by Republican Tom O'Mara, under different district numbers and lines, since 2011.

Geography
District 58 covers some or all of 5 counties in Western New York along the Pennsylvania border: Chemung, Schuyler, Steuben, Tompkins, and Yates, incorporating the cities of Ithaca and Elmira.

The district is located entirely within New York’s 19th and 23rd congressional district, and overlaps with the 124th, 125th, 132nd, 133rd, and 148th districts of the New York State Assembly.

Recent election results

2020

2018

2016

2014

2012

Federal results in District 58

References

58